Pemphigus  is a genus of true bugs belonging to the family Aphididae.

The genus has almost cosmopolitan distribution.

Species:

Pemphigus andropogiae 
Pemphigus betae 
Pemphigus birimatus
Pemphigus borealis 
Pemphigus brevicornis 
Pemphigus burrowi 
Pemphigus bursarius 
Pemphigus bursifex 
Pemphigus circellatus 
Pemphigus coluteae 
Pemphigus cylindricus 
Pemphigus diani 
Pemphigus dorocola
Pemphigus eastopi
Pemphigus echnochloaphaga 
Pemphigus ephemeratus 
Pemphigus fatauae 
Pemphigus formicarius 
Pemphigus formicetorum 
Pemphigus fuscicornis 
Pemphigus gairi 
Pemphigus groenlandicus 
Pemphigus hydrophilus
Pemphigus immunis 
Pemphigus indicus
Pemphigus iskanderkuli 
Pemphigus knowltoni 
Pemphigus laurifolia
Pemphigus longicornus 
Pemphigus mangkamensis 
Pemphigus matsumurai 
Pemphigus microsetosus 
Pemphigus minor 
Pemphigus mongolicus 
Pemphigus monophagus 
Pemphigus mordvilkovi
Pemphigus mordwilkoi 
Pemphigus nainitalensis 
Pemphigus napaeus 
Pemphigus niishimae
Pemphigus nortonii 
Pemphigus obesinymphae 
Pemphigus passeki 
Pemphigus phenax 
Pemphigus plicatus
Pemphigus popularius 
Pemphigus populi 
Pemphigus populicaulis 
Pemphigus populiglobuli 
Pemphigus populinigrae 
Pemphigus populiramulorum 
Pemphigus populitransversus 
Pemphigus populivenae 
Pemphigus protospirae 
Pemphigus rileyi 
Pemphigus rubiradicis 
Pemphigus saccosus
Pemphigus saliciradicis 
Pemphigus salicis
Pemphigus similis 
Pemphigus sinobursarius 
Pemphigus siphunculatus 
Pemphigus spyrothecae
Pemphigus tartareus 
Pemphigus tibetapolygoni 
Pemphigus tibetensis 
Pemphigus trehernei 
Pemphigus turritus 
Pemphigus vesicarius 
Pemphigus vulgaris 
Pemphigus wuduensis 
Pemphigus yanagi
Pemphigus yangcola

References

Aphididae